This is a list of Arminia Bielefeld managers. Although the club was formed in 1905, it wasn't until 1922 when František Zoubek became the first manager of the club. The club had 48 managers in their history. Among these men were famous managers like Otto Rehhagel, who led the Greece national football team to win the Euro 2004. Ernst Middendorp, the club's manager of the century, holds the record with 93 games in the Bundesliga. The current manager is Michael Frontzeck, who was appointed on 1 January 2008.

Managers

Sources 
 
 

Bielefeld
managers